Indre Fosen is a municipality in Trøndelag county, Norway. It is located in the traditional district of Fosen. The administrative centre of the municipality is the village of Årnset. Other villages in Indre Fosen include Askjem, Dalbygda, Hasselvika, Husbysjøen, Leira, Leksvik, Råkvåg, Rørvika, Seter, Stadsbygd, Verrabotn, and Vanvikan. The Norwegian County Road 755 runs through the municipality.

The  municipality is the 102nd largest by area out of the 356 municipalities in Norway. Indre Fosen is the 113th most populous municipality in Norway with a population of 9,899.

General information

The municipality was established on 1 January 2018, the same day that Trøndelag county was established. Indre Fosen straddles the former county border, as it was formed by the unification of the neighboring municipalities of Leksvik (formerly in Nord-Trøndelag) and Rissa (formerly in Sør-Trøndelag).

On 1 January 2020, the Verrabotn area of neighboring Verran Municipality was transferred to Indre Fosen.

Name
The municipality is named after the traditional district of Fosen in which it is located. The last element is Fosen which means "hiding place" or "hidden port". Thus, the name refers to the inner part of the Fosen district. The district is named after the island of Storfosna ("Big Fosen") in Ørland municipality.

Coat of arms
The coat of arms was adopted in 2017 for use starting on 1 January 2018 when the new municipality was established. These arms were originally granted to the old Leksvik Municipality on 28 September 1990 and then they were re-adopted for the new Indre Fosen Municipality after the merger of Leksvik and Rissa Municipality. The official blazon is "Per chevron embowed azure and argent point ending in trefoil". This means the arms have a field (background) that is divided by a line in the shape of a chevron with curved sides that meet at a point. A trefoil is located on top of this point. The background above the line is blue and the background below this line has a tincture of argent which means it is commonly colored white, but if it is made out of metal, then silver is used. The blue part represents the Trondheimsfjord and the white/silver part represents the land, particularly the Amborneset peninsula where King Sverre Sigurdsson fought his last sea battle on 8 June 1198. There is a clover/trefoil design at the end of the silver part which represents life and growth. The arms were designed by Einar H. Skjærvold.

Churches
The Church of Norway has six parishes (which is both singular and plural) within the municipality. Together with the other municipalities on the Fosen peninsula (Bjugn, Osen, Roan, Ørland, and Åfjord), Indre Fosen is part of the Fosen prosti (deanery) in the Diocese of Nidaros.

History

The first inhabitants are believed to have moved to this area some 3,000 years ago. They left several pieces of cutting tools which are now placed in museums. The Leksvik area does not appear in recorded history before the Viking Age when the villages of Leksvik and Hindrem became quite important in the local area. In both Leksvik and Hindrem there have been found great tombs and ruins of buildings and longboats. On Borgen, there is a hill between Hindrem and Seter that may have been a great Viking fortress, but this could also be tracks made by the glaciers during the last ice age. After the Black Death struck Norway in 1349, Leksvik fell into silence for some 300 years.

In more modern history, Leksvik and Hindrem are small and relatively isolated villages, north of Trondheimsfjord. Two churches stood here, a church in Leksvik and a stave church in Hindrem, but this broke down in 1655 and was replaced by a modern wooden church. In the 19th century, the church of Hindrem was demolished, and the new Stranda Church was built in Vanvikan. Leksvik became well known for its goats and had 5,000 of them at their peak number.

During World War II, Leksvik was settled by German troops with the main camp on the top of Våttåhaugen, a hill north of the village of Leksvik. But as a small and isolated village, nothing of great importance happened there during the war, and it was mostly peaceful although bombs fell over Trondheim, on the south side of the fjord. After electric power first came to Leksvik, Bjørn Lyng founded the first industry in Vanvikan and Leksvik. After the first road was finally finished in the early 1960s, industry grew rapidly and replaced the goats.

This slide is particularly famous because a large portion of the slide happened to be recorded on film by two amateur photographers.

Geography

Indre Fosen was located on the southern part of the Fosen peninsula along the coast of Trondheimsfjorden and the Stjørnfjorden, surrounding the municipality on three sides by water. There are several large lakes located in Indre Fosen including Storvatnet, Meltingvatnet, and Botn. The municipalities of Åfjord, Verran, and Inderøy lie to the north and the municipalities of Bjugn and Ørland lie to the west.

The Flakk–Rørvik Ferry crosses the Trondheimsfjord connecting the village of Rørvik to the city of Trondheim to the south.

Government
All municipalities in Norway, including Indre Fosen, are responsible for primary education (kindergarten through 10th grade), outpatient health services, senior citizen services, unemployment and other social services, zoning, economic development, and municipal roads. The municipality is governed by a municipal council of elected representatives, which in turn elects a mayor.

For the purposes of judicial divisions, the municipality is part of the Fosen District Court which is under the Frostating Court of Appeal.

Municipal council
The municipal council of Indre Fosen is made up of 37 representatives. The party breakdown of the council is as follows:

Mayor
The mayors of Indre Fosen:
2018-2019: Steinar Saghaug (H)
2019–present: Bjørnar Buhaug (Sp)

Notable people 
 Nils Waltersen Aasen (1878 in Stadsbygd – 1925) an arms inventor, developed the modern hand grenade and land mine just prior to WWI
 Anders John Aune (1923 in Stjørna – 2011) a Norwegian politician, county governor of Finnmark 1974-1989
 Oddmund Raudberget (born 1932 in Stadsbygd) a Norwegian artist, painter, and sculptor
 Ingebjørg Karmhus (1936 in Leksvik – 2009) a Norwegian politician, Mayor of Leksvik 1986 to 1999
 Villy Haugen (born 1944 in Leksvik) a former speed skater, bronze medallist at the 1964 Winter Olympics
 Einar Strøm (born 1945) a Norwegian politician, Mayor of Leksvik from 2007
 Bente Kvitland (born 1974) a Norwegian former footballer, Olympic champion with the Norway women's national football team, grew up in Skaugdalen

References

External links 

 
Municipalities of Trøndelag
2018 establishments in Norway